Botsorhel is a commune in the Finistère department of Brittany in north-western France.

Population
Inhabitants of Botsorhel are called Botsorhélois in French.

See also
Communes of the Finistère department
Parc naturel régional d'Armorique

References

External links

 Mayors of Finistère Association  

Communes of Finistère